Medora Township may refer to:

 Medora Township, Reno County, Kansas
 Medora Township, Ontario, now part of Muskoka Lakes